BBV Productions is a UK-based video and audio production company founded in 1991, specialising in science fiction drama. The company has expanded to include publishing of novels and scripts associated with its productions.

Origin
Company co-founder Bill Baggs is a longtime fan of the British science fiction television series Doctor Who, and BBV productions often involve characters or actors from that series. It was originally founded as "Bill & Ben Video". The "Ben" in the company name is the nickname of Bill Baggs's wife and fellow company co-founder, Helen. Marian Baggs, the mother of Bill Baggs, also operated a second distribution chain on behalf of BBV.

Video
BBV's first production was Summoned by Shadows (1991), co-produced with the BBC Film Club. Partly as a homage to Doctor Who, which Baggs was a fan of, and partly in a pragmatic attempt to take advantage of a pre-existing audience, Summoned by Shadows was a Who-style tale of strange doings on a distant planet starring Colin Baker as the nameless protagonist (listed in the credits as "The Stranger"). Nicola Bryant co-starred as "Miss Brown". The adventures of The Stranger ran to six videos (and two audio dramas, the second remade as the sixth video). (For more information, see The Stranger (video series).)

BBV's next effort was The AirZone Solution?, an ecologically themed thriller about a near-future conspiracy. Released in 1993, Doctor Who's thirtieth anniversary year, it involved four out of five surviving ex-Doctors. Baker and Bryant starred. Successor Sylvester McCoy and predecessors Peter Davison and Jon Pertwee also appeared as members of a small group joined against a sinister conspiracy.

The Zero Imperative (1994) marked a new departure for BBV. Although stuffed to the gills with ex-Doctor Who guest stars, only one of them was actually playing the same character: the story was built around Caroline John's Liz Shaw, the Doctor's companion in the seventh season of Doctor Who, now depicted as an investigator for PROBE (the "Preternatural Research Bureau"). The PROBE series ran for an additional three stories; all four were written by Mark Gatiss, who found more widespread fame as a member of the League of Gentlemen, later going on to write episodes for the revived series. The potentially-confusing mixture of Caroline John reprising her Doctor Who role with other recognisable Who stars playing different characters worked against the series, as did the way that Liz Shaw often seemed to be herself a different character from the Doctor Who original. (The latter problem may have been exacerbated by the fact that, although BBV had obtained permission to use Liz Shaw, they had no rights relating to Doctor Who itself - which meant that no explicit reference could be made to any other aspect of Doctor Who, including the events of the stories in which Liz had appeared.)

BBV's next series was a spin-off from two Doctor Who stories in the 1970s in which the Doctor assisted the United Nations Intelligence Taskforce (UNIT) in defeating the Autons, robotic invaders sent to conquer Earth on behalf of the alien Nestenes. The trilogy, beginning with Auton in 1997, recounted UNIT's battle against another Auton invasion, this time without the Doctor's aid (since BBV had obtained permission to use UNIT and the Autons, but was never given permission to use the Doctor himself). Auton was also the first BBV production to have no Doctor Who guest stars at all, after Nicholas Courtney (who was to reprise his Doctor Who role as UNIT commander Brigadier Lethbridge-Stewart) had to withdraw from the project, due to ill health. With Courtney out, the focus of the series was the original character of Lockwood, an enigmatic UNIT agent played by Michael Wade.

After the success of the Auton trilogy, BBV produced Cyberon (involving a race of alien cyborgs reminiscent of the Cybermen). 2001's "Do you Have a Licence to Save this Planet?" was a comedy starring Sylvester McCoy as the chiropodist.  This spoof not only referenced previous BBV productions- but also Doctor Who itself.

BBV's Zygon: When Being You Just Isn't Enough (previously titled Zygon: When Being Me Is Not Enough). In which Mike Kirkwood dreams of being a monster, unaware that he is in fact a Zygon, believing himself to be human. This story also includes Jo Castleton's character of Doctor Lauren Anderson from Cyberon.

A new PROBE film was released 15 April 2015 with Hazel Burrows taking over from Caroline John as Liz Shaw.

Audio 
After a few earlier experiments, BBV began regularly releasing audio dramas on CD in 1998, under the umbrella title Audio Adventures in Time & Space. The mainstay of the CD line to begin with was a series starring Sylvester McCoy and Sophie Aldred (the Doctor/companion team from the 1987, 1988 and 1989 seasons of Doctor Who) as a pair of wanderers in time and space named "The Professor" (McCoy) and "Ace" (Aldred) who so closely resembled the characters McCoy and Aldred had played on Doctor Who - even addressing each other by the same nicknames - that the BBC stepped in and their seventh outing, Ghosts, consequently introduced a number of changes to the characters that made the resemblance somewhat less close, the main one being that the protagonists were now called "The Dominie" (McCoy) and "Alice" (Aldred).

The first of the Audio Adventures in Time & Space not to include the McCoy/Aldred double act was Cyber-Hunt, the first BBV production about the Cyberons. A further Who-ish note was added by the introduction of an amnesic space traveler played by Nicholas Briggs, who some years earlier had played the Doctor in the Audio Visuals series of unlicensed fan audios.  (He was dubbed "Fred" by one of the other characters after her pet goldfish).

BBV moved away from characters-who-might-be-the-Doctor (a field that, in any case, lost some of its appeal for fan audiences once Big Finish Productions began producing officially licensed Doctor Who audio dramas with the original actors reprising their incarnation of the character) and, following the success of the Auton trilogy, focussed more on stand-alone dramas about various Doctor Who alien races, licensed directly from the writers who created them. For some of those writers, the BBV audios have offered a chance to revisit their creations: for instance, the range includes a story by Pip & Jane Baker explaining what happened to the Rani (last seen in Doctor Who being abducted by a group of aliens that were also created by the writing pair), and a series of stories by Lawrence Miles about his history-spanning terrorist organisation Faction Paradox.

In 2002, BBV announced that they would not produce any more audio CDs, but would instead concentrate on their new DVD releases.

In 2022 BBV announced physical collections of their audios would be produced.

Productions

Video

The Stranger
Summoned by Shadows by Christian Darkin
More Than A Messiah by Nigel Fairs
In Memory Alone by Nicholas Briggs
The Terror Game by Nicholas Briggs
Breach of the Peace by Nicholas Briggs
Eye of the Beholder by Nicholas Briggs
The Auton trilogy
Auton by Nicholas Briggs
Auton 2: Sentinel by Nicholas Briggs
Auton 3: Awakening by Arthur Wallis (Nicholas Briggs) and Paul Ebbs
Faction Paradox
P.R.O.B.E. Case Files: "Daylight Savings" by James Hornby
Overture to Sabbath and the King by Aristide Twain (YouTube release)
Erimem
My mate, Erimem by Iain McLaughlin (YouTube release)
 The Brigadier Adventures
P.R.O.B.E. Case Files: "Legend" by James Hornby
Standalone
The Airzone Solution by Nicholas Briggs
Cyberon by Lance Parkin
Do You Have A Licence To Save This Planet? by Paul Ebbs and Gareth Preston
Zygon: When Being You Just Isn't Enough by Jonathan Blum & Lance Parkin
Sunrise: Love Again by William Baggs & Kristina Wilde
Documentary
Stranger Than Fiction
Stranger Than Fiction 2: From Script To Screen
The Doctors: 30 Years of Time Travel and Beyond
Bidding Adieu
P.R.O.B.E.
The Zero Imperative by Mark Gatiss
The Devil of Winterborne by Mark Gatiss
Unnatural Selection by Mark Gatiss
Ghosts of Winterborne by Mark Gatiss
When to Die by Bill Baggs
P.R.O.B.E. Case Files 
Volume 1
"First Entry" by James Hornby
"Kelpie" by James Hornby
"Peckham Poltergeist" by James Hornby
"Manchester" by James Hornby
"Shadow People" by James Hornby
"Stacey Facade" by James Hornby
"Varunastra" by James Hornby
"Doctor X" by James Hornby
"Goo!" by Bill Baggs
"Sherwood Sorceress" by James Hornby
Volume 2
"A Message From Sir Andrew"
"Daylight Savings" by James Hornby 
"Ichor" by Bill Baggs
"Out of the Shadows of Doubt" by James Hornby, Hunter O'Connell, James Wylder & Lucy Wood-Ives, from an initial concept by Aristide Twain
"Fog" By Bill Baggs
"Lauren Anderson" by James Hornby and Bill Baggs
"Living Fiction" by Warren Lewis
"The Only Cure" by James Hornby
"Ex-President" by James Hornby
"Legend" by James Hornby
Volume 3
"Maxie Masters" by Bill Baggs
"O'Kane" by Bill Baggs
"Mist Mystery" by Bill Baggs
"Stranger" by Bill Baggs

Audio

Licensed Doctor Who spin-offs

K-9 and his Mistress
The Choice by Nigel Fairs
The Search by Mark Duncan
Zygons
Homeland by Paul Dearing
Absolution by Paul Ebbs
The Barnacled Baby by Anthony Keetch
Krynoids
The Root of All Evil by Lance Parkin
The Green Man by Zoltán Déry
Sontarans
Silent Warrior by Peter Grehan
Old Soldiers by Simon J Gerard and Colin Hill
Conduct Unbecoming by Gareth Preston
Rutans
In 2 Minds by Iain Hepburn
The "I"
I Scream by Lance Parkin
Guy de Carnac
The Quality of Mercy by Dave McIntee
The Rani
The Rani Reaps The Whirlwind by Pip & Jane Baker
The Wirrn
Race Memory by Paul Ebbs
Faction Paradox
The Eleven Day Empire by Lawrence Miles
The Shadow Play by Lawrence Miles
Sabbath Dei by Lawrence Miles
The Year of the Cat by Lawrence Miles
Movers by Lawrence Miles
A Labyrinth of Histories by Lawrence Miles
Eternal Escape by James Hornby
Dionus's War
Call Me Ishmael by J.T. Mulholland
The Healer's Sin by J.T. Mulholland
Me & My Ghost by Bill Baggs
Sabbath and the King by Aristide Twain
The Confession of Brother Signet by Michael Gilroy-Sinclair
Hellscape
Lucifer by Trevor Spencer
Lucifer's Sleep by Trevor Spencer
Babylon's Own Personal Hell by Trevor Spencer
Brother's Keeper by Trevor Spencer
Unwanted Guest by Trevor Spencer
Lilith Fades by Trevor Spencer
P.R.O.B.E.
The Door We Forgot by James Hornby and James Wylder
9 to 5 by James Hornby
A Worthy Successor by James Hornby and James Wylder
She Came From Another World! by James Wylder	
What Happened in Manchester by James Hornby
Broken Bonds by James Hornby
Silver-Tongued Liars by James Wylder
New Companions
Maxie by Bill Baggs
Sam Myers by Trevor Spencer
Giles: The Beginning by Bill Baggs
First Case by Bill Baggs
Bold by Bill Baggs
 The Brigadier Adventures
Memories of Tomorrow by John Peel	
New Pastures by James Hornby	
The Fall of Shield Sentai by Charles EP Murphy	
The Man Inside by Bill Baggs
Necessary Force by Steve Lyons
Translation by John Peel
Erimem
The Beast of Stalingrad by Iain McLaughlin
Prime Imperative by Iain McLaughlin
Churchill's Castle by Iain McLaughlin
The Makers
"Maker's Wish: After Dark"
"Slalvok" by Trevor Spencer & Bill Baggs
"Maker's Wish""
"Ticket To Ride" by Trevor Spencer

Unofficial/Apocryphal Doctor Who spin-offs

The Dominie and Alice ("The Professor" and "Ace" until Guests for the Night)
Republica by Mark Gatiss
Island of Lost Souls by Mark Gatiss
Prosperity Island by Tim Saward
The Left Hand of Darkness by Mark Duncan
The Other Side by Mark Duncan
Guests for the Night by Nigel Fairs
Ghosts by Nigel Fairs
Only Human by Mark J. Thompson
Blood Sports by Nigel Fairs
Punchline by Jeremy Leadbetter (Robert Shearman)
Fred
Cyber-Hunt by Martin Peterson
Vital Signs by Tim Saward
Cyberons
Cyber-Hunt by Martin Peterson
Cybergeddon by Paul Ebbs
Cyberon by James Hornby (unabridged audiobook of the novelisation of the film)
Silver-Tongued Liars by James Wylder
Curse of the Cyberons by Chris McAuley
The Weapon and the Warrior by John Peel
The Stranger
The Last Mission by Nicholas Briggs
Eye of the Storm by Arthur Wallis (Nicholas Briggs)
Stand-Alone
Infidel's Comet by Colin Hill and Simon J Gerard
The Pattern by Mark Duncan
A Whisper in the Darkness by Chris McAuley and Dacre Stoker
The Forbidden Act by Chris McAuley

Books

Novelisations
Republica by Micah K. Spurling
Cyber-Hunt by Callum Phillpott
Cybergeddon by Lupan Evezan
The Rani Reaps the Whirlwind by Micah K. Spurling
The Airzone Solution by Charles EP Murphy
Auton by David Black
The Root of All Evil by Paul Mount
The Choice by James Mulholland

Scripts
Faction Paradox
Faction Paradox Protocols: The Scripts Vol. 1 by Lawrence Miles
Faction Paradox Protocols: The Scripts Vol. 2 by Lawrence Miles
Faction Paradox Protocols: The Scripts Vol. 3 by Lawrence Miles
Erimem
Erimem: The Beast of Stalingrad - The Script by Iain McLaughlin

Comics
Cyberon
Before The Storm by Leopold Agnew

See also 

 Big Finish Productions
 Reeltime Pictures

References

External links 
 Bill & Ben Video (BBV) at IMDb
 BBV website
 The TARDIS Library — Full guide to Doctor Who books, videos and audios. Includes an expanded listing of BBV's Doctor Who releases, with cover images & user ratings/reviews.
 Downtime - The Lost Years of Doctor Who Dylan Rees,  (Obverse Books, 2017)